Krovim Krovim (lit. Close Relatives/Near Ones, Dear Ones) is an Israeli television sitcom created by Ephraim Sidon and B. Michael. The series which originally aired on the Israeli Educational Television channel in the years 1983 - 1986 is known as the first Israeli sitcom.

The series focuses on an extended Israeli family which shares a residential apartment building in the center of Tel Aviv.

The opening tune of the series was composed by Nurit Hirsch.

Synopsis 

The series focuses on an extended Israeli family which lives in three apartments iresidential apartment building in the center of Tel Aviv. Ilan and Tiki, and their daughter Galia live on the third floor, Yehoram (Tiki's brother) and Liora live on the second floor with their three children - Eviatar, Efrat and Molly. Hannah, who is Yehoram and Tiki's aunt, live on the first floor.

The series dealt mainly with a variety of topics from everyday life situations of typical middle class urban secular Israeli families in Israel in the 1980s, such as school plays, IDF Flight course, Vegetarianism, Astrology, elections for the board of the Condominium, dealing with burglary, celebrating birthdays, and other satirical and social topics such as inflation, Israel–United States relations, hiring an Israeli Arab house keeper, Mizrahim-Ashkenazim relations, Intermarriages, etc.

Cast

Main characters 

Most of the characters in the series were called by the first names of the actors. In addition, it was decided that the main characters won't have last names.

 Hanna (played by Hanna Maron) – Yehoram and Tiki's aunt, who lives in her own apartment in the same building. She is vibrant, sassy, and full of energy, tends to regularly comes up with bright and amusing ideas. Despite being the oldest in the group Hanna proves to actually be the youngest in spirit and openness to new ideas. She has conversations with her plants to relieve her boredom. Answering "Open!" when her door bell rings became the main hallmarks of the series.
 Yehoram (Played by Yehoram Gaon) – Leora's husband, and the father of Eviatar, Efrat and Muli. Tiki's brother. He is a mechanical engineer. He is a hypochondriac who complains regularly about aches, pain, depression and diseases and shows great proficiency in all types of medicines and means of healing. 
 Liora (played by ) – Yehoram's wife and the mother of Eviatar, Efrat and Muli. Leora works in a public employment agency. Tends to be quite pessimistic, uptight and cynical. She is a chronic smoker.
 Ilan (Played by Ilan Dar) – Tiki's husband and Galia's father. Ilan works as an Insurance agent. Occasionally portrayed as being stingy and manipulative. He tends to often formulate sophisticated plans to gain wealth rapidly. Occasionally Ilan seems to be the only normal person in the building.
 Tiki (Played by Tiki Dayan) – Ilan's wife's and Galia's mother. She is Yehoram's sister. She works as a tour guide. She is very energetic, lively and practical. Tiki occasionally talks on the phone for hours.
 Eviatar (played by Moshe Gershoni) – The eldest son of Yehoram and Leora. A bright young man who during the series enlists in the Israel Defense Forces. He starts a pilot's course but is eventually rejected.
 Efrat (played by Natalie Mairovich) – Yehoram and Leora's middle daughter.
 Muli (played by Muli Segev) – Yehoram and Leora's youngest son.
 Galia (Played by Galia Kedem) – Ilan and Tiki's only daughter.

Recurring characters 
 Mr. Kuzilewicz (Played by Shmuel Segal) – Chairman of the Condominium.
 Doron (Played by Doron Nesher) – Hanna's sub-tenant.

History 
The original idea was to produce a comedy TV series for the Israeli Educational Television channel which would deal with parental-children relationships. The original proposed name for the production during its pre-production stages was "The Family" (המשפחה). In an interview with Modi Bar-On, the director of the series Yitzhak Shauli stated that when he and the producer of the show Risha Tierman decided originally to produce an Israeli sitcom, they both traveled to the United States where they watched the filming of the American sitcom "Three's Company" in order to learn about the directing process and the production process of a successful sitcom. Shauli stated that their experience in the U.S. raised concerns that the conditions available to them in Israel were not sufficient, nevertheless they decided to try and produce an Israeli sitcom anyway.

The address of the building, which appears in the show as "Vitek 9", is fictitious. The building which is shown in the opening sequence of the series and in which most of the plot allegedly takes place, is actually a building located on the crossroad between Rothschild Boulevard and Hasmonean street in Tel Aviv. The name "Vitek" stems from the name of the husband of the series' producer, Risha Tierman, who died a few months before the start of the production. The number 9 was chosen because the building focuses on 9 family members (Hanna, Yehoram, Leora, Eviatar, Efrat, Molly, Tiki, Ilan and Galia). Although it is a simple and modest building, it later on became a famous landmark due to the immense popularity the series gained in the mid 1980s in Israel.

Broadcast history 
Although the series was produced by the Israeli Educational Television, it originally aired during the evening hours of the Israeli Channel 1 (on behalf of the Israeli Broadcasting Authority) and between February until May 1983 (first season), 1984 (second season) and 1986 (third season) and in re-runs between July to October during the afternoons.

Since the original broadcast of the series, the series has been aired in frequent reruns, mainly on the Israeli channel 23.

Reunion episode production 
During the early 2000s Yehoram Gaon was interviewed in an Army Radio programme in which he was asked why a reunion episode for the series has not been produced yet. As a result the hosts of the programme began a campaign aimed at getting support for a reunion episode. Most of the original main cast agreed to participate in the production. Ephraim Sidon expressed his support while writing a script that would corresponds to the 2000s. Yaffa Vigodsky, the CEO of the Israeli Educational Television (which retains the rights to the series) agreed and the Discount Bank agreed to finance the production. The reunion episode was named "Hamatzav Tzav" was filmed in the studios of the Israeli Educational Television on November 11, 2004 in front of an audience, and was broadcast in the Israeli Channel 2 on 24 March 2005.

The reunion episode featured Tom Gal who played Nevo, Eviatar's son and Sivan Sasson, who played Galia (Galia Kedem retired from acting). Muli Segev refused to participate in the production.

DVD 
On 7 June 2009 the first DVD Box Set of the series became available containing all 37 episodes, the reunion episode, as well as a documentary film chronicling the production of the reunion episodes.

External links 
 
 Krovim Krovim, on Kan Educational.

1983 Israeli television series debuts
1986 Israeli television series endings
Israeli television sitcoms
1980s Israeli television series
Israeli Educational Television